USS Endurance (AMc-77) was an  minesweeper acquired by the U.S. Navy for the dangerous task of removing mines from minefields laid in the water to prevent ships from passing.

World War II service 

Endurance was launched on 19 June 1941 by Gibbs Gas Engine Co., Jacksonville, Florida. Placed in service on 11 October 1941, she served in a noncommissioned status throughout the war in the 10th Naval District.

Post-war decommissioning 

She was placed out of service on 6 December 1945 and transferred to the Maritime Administration on 7 July 1947 for disposal.

References

External links 
 NavSource Online: Mine Warfare Vessel Photo Archive - Endurance (AMc 77)

 

Accentor-class minesweepers
World War II mine warfare vessels of the United States
Ships built in Jacksonville, Florida
1941 ships